Henry Keith Moffatt, FRS FRSE (born 12 April 1935) is a Scottish mathematician with research interests in the field of fluid dynamics, particularly magnetohydrodynamics and the theory of turbulence. He was Professor of Mathematical Physics at the University of Cambridge from 1980 to 2002.

Early life and education

Moffatt was born on 12 April 1935 to Emmeline Marchant and Frederick Henry Moffatt. He was schooled at George Watson's College, Edinburgh, going on to study Mathematical Sciences at the University of Edinburgh, graduating in 1957. He then went to Trinity College, Cambridge, where he studied mathematics and, 1959, he was a Wrangler. In 1960, he was awarded a Smith's Prize while preparing his PhD. He received his PhD in 1962, the title of his dissertation was Magnetohydrodynamic Turbulence.

Career

After completing his PhD, Moffatt joined the staff of the Mathematics Faculty in Cambridge as an Assistant Lecturer and became a Fellow of Trinity College. He was appointed a lecturer in 1964, and held the office of Tutor, then Senior Tutor, at Trinity between 1970 and 1976.

In 1977 he was appointed to the Chair of Applied Mathematics at the University of Bristol. He held this position until 1980 when he returned to Cambridge to take up the Chair in Mathematical Physics, renewing his Fellowship of Trinity College. In 2002 he was made an Emeritus Professor of the University (he remains a Fellow of Trinity).

In the early 2000s he published papers on the theory of Euler's Disk.

Moffatt has published more than 200 papers.

Appointments
 DAMTP, University of Cambridge: Assistant Lecturer, 1961–1964; Lecturer, 1964–1976
 Trinity College, Cambridge: Fellow, 1961–76; Tutor, 1970–1974; Senior Tutor, 1975–1976
 Bristol University: Professor of Applied Mathematics, 1977–1980
 DAMTP, University of Cambridge: Professor of Mathematical Physics, 1980–2002; Head of Department, 1983–1991; Emeritus Professor, 2002--
 Trinity College, Cambridge: Fellow, 1980–-
 Isaac Newton Institute for Mathematical Sciences, Cambridge: Director, 1996–2001; Senior Fellow, 2001--
 Editor, Journal of Fluid Mechanics, 1966–1983
 École Polytechnique, Palaiseau: Visiting Professor (professeur d'exercise partiel), 1992–1999
 École Normale Supérieure, Paris: Chaire Internationale de Recherche Blaise Pascal, 2001–2003
 African Institute for Mathematical Sciences, Muizenberg, South Africa: Trustee and Member of Council, 2003
 Leverhulme Emeritus Professor, 2003–2005
 International Union of Theoretical and Applied Mechanics (IUTAM): Member of Bureau, 1992–2000; President, 2000–2004; Vice-President, 2004--

Honours and awards
 Fellow of the Royal Society, 1986
 Fellow of the Royal Society of Edinburgh, 1987
 Foreign Member of the Royal Netherlands Academy of Arts and Sciences, 1991
 Member of Academia Europæa, 1994
 Foreign Member of the Académie des Sciences, Paris, 1998
 Officier des Palmes académiques, 1998
 Foreign Member of the Accademia Nazionale dei Lincei, Rome, 2001
 Panetti-Ferrari International Prize and Gold Medal, Academy of Sciences, Turin, 2001
 Fellow of the American Physical Society, 2003
 Euromech Prize for Fluid Mechanics, 2003
 Caribbean Award for Fluid Dynamics, 2004
 Senior Whitehead Prize of the London Mathematical Society, 2005
 Hughes Medal of the Royal Society, 2005

Personal life 
In 1960 he married Katharine (Linty), and together they had four children, two daughters and two sons, one of whom is deceased.

References

Sources 
 Home page
 Biography
 Publications list
 CV

Living people
1935 births
Fellows of the Royal Society
Fellows of the Royal Society of Edinburgh
Fellows of Trinity College, Cambridge
People educated at George Watson's College
Alumni of the University of Edinburgh
Members of Academia Europaea
Members of the French Academy of Sciences
Members of the Royal Netherlands Academy of Arts and Sciences
Foreign associates of the National Academy of Sciences
David Crighton medalists
Fluid dynamicists
Cambridge mathematicians
Fellows of the American Physical Society
Journal of Fluid Mechanics editors